Murota (written: 室田) is a Japanese surname. Notable people with the surname include:

, Japanese actor
, Japanese shogi player
, Japanese golfer
, Japanese singer and idol

Japanese-language surnames